Pleurolucina is a genus of saltwater clams, marine bivalve molluscs in the subfamily Lucininae of the family Lucinidae.

Species
 † Pleurolucina amabilis (Dall, 1898) 
 Pleurolucina harperae Glover & J. D. Taylor, 2016
 Pleurolucina hendersoni (Britton, 1972)
 † Pleurolucina imbricolamella (Dockery, 1982) 
 Pleurolucina leucocyma (Dall, 1886)
 Pleurolucina leucocymoides (H. N. Lowe, 1935)
 † Pleurolucina quadricostata (Dall, 1903) 
 Pleurolucina sombrerensis (Dall, 1886)
 Pleurolucina taylori Coan & Valentich-Scott, 2012
 † Pleurolucina tithonis (Dall, 1903) 
 † Pleurolucina triloba (Dockery, 1982) 
 Pleurolucina undata (Carpenter, 1865)

References

 Taylor J. & Glover E. (2021). Biology, evolution and generic review of the chemosymbiotic bivalve family Lucinidae. London: The Ray Society [Publication 182]. 319 pp.
 Coan, E. V.; Valentich-Scott, P. (2012). Bivalve seashells of tropical West America. Marine bivalve mollusks from Baja California to northern Peru. 2 vols, 1258 pp.

External links
 Dall W.H. (1901). Synopsis of the Lucinacea and of the American species. Proceedings of the United States National Museum. 23: 779-833, pls 39-42.
 Glover E.A. & Taylor J.D. (2016). Pleurolucina from the western Atlantic and eastern Pacific Oceans: a new intertidal species from Curaçao with unusual shell microstructure (Mollusca, Bivalvia, Lucinidae). ZooKeys. 620: 1-19

Lucinidae
Bivalve genera